Two ships of the Royal Navy have been named HMS Musketeer:

 was an  launched in 1915 and sold in 1921 for breaking up.
 was a M-class destroyer launched in 1941 and scrapped in 1955.

Royal Navy ship names